Massinissa Guermah (1983, in Beni Douala, Tizi Ouzou Province – 20 April 2001) was an 18-year-old Kabyle (Algerian) high school student arrested by Algerian gendarmes on 18 April 2001. In circumstances still not clear, he received gunshot wounds inside the gendarmerie. The same day, three college students were arbitrarily arrested in the town of Amizour (Béjaïa). Guermah later died of his wounds in the Mustapha Hospital on 20 April 2001.

On 22 April 2001, the commander of La Gendarmerie Nationale released a statement in which he said that Guermah had been arrested after aggressive behaviour following a theft. The Interior Minister Yazid Zerhouni described Guermah as a "twenty-six year old delinquent."  In response to the Interior Minister's statement, Guermah's parents sent the national press a school report stating that the Massinissa was indeed an eighteen-year-old school student. Seven days after Guermah's death the military authorities gave an account of how it had occurred. Constable Mestari Merabet was referred to the Blida Military Tribunai for "breach of instructions and manslaughter." But the incident was described as an accident caused when Merabet accidentally fired his gun. However, according to Koceila Merakeb who was arrested with Guermah, one round of bullets was fired in the waiting room, two bullets ricocheted off the floor and the third landed at the feet of another constable close by. Then Constable Mestari Merabet directed his gun at Guermah and fired.

Guermah's killing caused riots in Kabylia lasting for several months; this series of events is referred to as the Black Spring. The violence was fuelled by an Algerian national campaign to impose the Arabic language on its people in place of indigenous languages, including Kabyle.

Sources
L'Association Internet pour la promotion des droits de l'homme - L'enquête sur les morts de Kabylie - III. LES ÉVÉNEMENTS DÉCLENCHANTS
 :fr:Massinissa Guermah

See also 
Black Spring
Berberism

1983 births
2001 deaths
People from Beni Douala
Kabyle people
Berberism in Algeria
Berber Algerians